Numedal is a valley and a traditional district in Eastern Norway located within the county of Buskerud. It traditionally includes the municipalities Flesberg, Nore og Uvdal and Rollag. Administratively, it now also includes Kongsberg.

Geography 
Numedal is the southernmost valley of the major valleys in Eastern Norway. Numedal is largely a U-shaped valley. Most of the area is mountainous, especially west of the main valley, with steep valley sides. Running north–south, it extends between Flesberg in the south to Rødberg in the north, passing through the municipalities of Flesberg, Rollag and Nore og Uvdal. The Numedalslågen, the third-longest river in Norway, flows through the valley before discharging into Oslofjord at Larvik.

Transportation 
National Road 40 runs from Larvik. National Road 7 crosses Hardangervidda to Geilo. Numedal Line Railway (Numedalsbanen) was opened in 1927 and stopped operations in 1988. The former railroad track from Veggli to Rødberg is now used principally for cycling.

Economy 
Agriculture and forestry are important industries in the valley along with hydropower generation, as well as growing tourist traffic.

Etymology 
The origin and meaning of the name are the same as that of Namdalen.

Attractions 

The area along the Numedalslågen from Flesberg up to the Hardangervidda through the valley has a large number of examples of Medieval Scandinavian architecture. There are still over 40 historic timber buildings and four stave churches:  Flesberg Stave Church, Rollag Stave Church, Nore Stave Church and Uvdal Stave Church.

Numedal was also the location of one of the "Nordmann's trails" (Nordmannsslepene), which were the old main roads between east and west over Hardangervidda. On the marked paths, remains of Stone Age dwelling places, bog iron works and grave mounds can be seen.

Numedal also has several museums including Nore og Uvdal Open Air Museum (Nore og Uvdal Bygdetun) in Uvdal, Rollag Open Air Museum (Rollag Bygdetun) in Rollag, and Dåset Open Air Museum (Dåset bygdetun) at Flesberg. These are collections of historic buildings, mostly built in the traditional style common for the valley.

Gallery

Climate 
Numedal has a subarctic climate (Dfc) with short, mild, and wet summers with cool nights and long, cold, and snowy winters.

References

Notes

Citations

Literature

External links 
 Tour suggestions from Numedal
 Nordmannsslepene
 Nore og Uvdal Bygdetun
 Rollag bygdetun
 Middelalderuka i Numedal

Districts of Viken
Valleys of Viken
Flesberg
Rollag
Nore og Uvdal